Ram Revilla (February 12, 1988 – October 29, 2011), born Ramgen Jose Magsaysay Bautista and also known as Ramgen Revilla, was a Filipino actor best known for his roles in various Filipino television series including his role as Jeff Gatdula in Tonyong Bayawak. Revilla was murdered on October 28, 2011. He was declared dead on arrival at the Parañaque Medical Center after being shot and stabbed in their family residence. There is no clear evidence about the gunman or the mastermind.

Personal life 
Revilla was born in Pasay to actor and former Philippine Senator Jose A. Bautista (Ramon Revilla, Sr.) and Genelyn Magsaysay. His name "Ramgen" is derived from the first names of his father and mother, Ramon and Genelyn. He grew up in Imus, Cavite. He is one of nine children of Revilla, Sr. to Magsaysay and also a half-brother of actor and Philippine Senator Ramon "Bong" Revilla, Jr. He followed his father's and brother's footsteps, landing roles on television when he was just 14 years old.

Filmography

Film

Television

Death 
Revilla was murdered by an unidentified assailant in his family residence at BF Homes in Parañaque City on October 28, 2011 with his younger sister Ma. Ramona Belen (Mara) and girlfriend Janelle Manahan present in the crime scene. He sustained 11 stab wounds on his body and a gunshot to the right side of his chest. Manahan suffered two gunshots on her face and shoulder, and Ramona was left uninjured. Citing a police report, Sen. Revilla, brother of the victim, said the gunman shot Ram Revilla with a .45 caliber gun and then stabbed him. Manahan survived the injuries she sustained.

Wake and burial 
October 29, 2011, the first day of Revilla's wake, was attended by members of his family, friends, and fans. President Benigno Aquino III expressed his condolences through the presidential deputy spokesperson Abigail Valte but did not attend the wake. A mass was held in the last night of his wake on November 1, 2011. His remains were buried on November 2, 2011 at the Revilla Mausoleum at Angelus Eternal Garden in Imus, Cavite, with his family and closest friends leading the funeral rites. His sister Ramona was outside the country during the wake and burial.

References

External links

Details of the murder case

1989 births
2011 deaths
People from Imus
Star Magic
Male actors from Cavite
Filipino people of Spanish descent
People murdered in the Philippines
Filipino murder victims
Deaths by stabbing in the Philippines
Deaths by firearm in the Philippines
Ram
Magsaysay family